Rim of the World High School is a public secondary school located in Lake Arrowhead, California, at the top of the mountain overlooking the San Bernardino Valley. It is part of the Rim of the World Unified School District and is the only comprehensive 9-12 high school in the system.

The school
Rim of the World High School has a student body size that ranges between 900 and 1,000 students.  Rim of the World High School is believed to be the first in California (and among only a handful in the nation) which has utilized both solar and wind energy for direct use by the high school.

The school teams are "The Fighting Scots." The official mascot is the Scottish Terrier, but the more widely accepted, unofficial mascot is William Wallace. At the school, there's a large mural of Mel Gibson dressed in the same garb he wore when he played William Wallace in Braveheart. A common rumor around the school is that Mel Gibson himself came to the school dressed as William Wallace and posed for the mural, though this is largely unproven.

The school's Advanced TV-Video class puts out a “TV Show” on their website rimtoday.tv every other week, that shows what's going on around campus and often skits put on by the students.

Green energy

Rim of the World High School utilizes both solar panels and wind turbines to supplement its energy needs.

Notable alumni
Mike Warnke (Class of 1965), Christian evangelist and Christian comedian
Tim D. White (Class of 1968), anthropologist, best known for his work on Lucy (Australopithecus afarensis)
Pat Hill (Class of 1970), Fresno State football head coach (1997–2011)
Eddie Elguera (Class of 1979), professional skateboarder
Jason Hall (Class of 1991), actor and Oscar-nominated screenwriter (for American Sniper, 2014)
Mike Wahle (Class of 1995), American football guard (1998–2008) and 2005 Pro Bowl selection
John Albert Gardner (Class of 1997), convicted of the murders of Chelsea King and Amber DuBois; currently serving two life sentences at California State Prison, Corcoran
Michelle Kwan (Class of 1998), Olympic figure skater
Nathan Chen, 2022 Olympic Gold medalist; 2017, 2018, 2019 U.S. champion; 2018, 2019 World champion figure skater
Kassie Lyn Logsdon (Class of 2005), Playboy Miss 2010 Playmate
Devin Sola (Class of 2007), Bassist for Motionless in White
Michael Griffin (escape artist) (Class of 1979), professional escape artist

References

External links
 Official School Homepage
 Official YouTube Education Channel

High schools in San Bernardino County, California
Public high schools in California